Tomio Mizokami (born 12 May, 1941) is a professor Emeritus of Osaka University, Japan. In 2018, he was conferred the Padma Sri by the President of India, at the Civil Investiture Ceremony on 2 April 2018, for his contribution to the fields of literature and education.

Education 
In 1983, Mizokami did his PhD from University of Delhi on Language Contact in Punjab-A sociolinguistic Study of Migrants' Language.

Career 
Between June and August 1994, he taught Punjabi at the University of California in Berkeley as part of their summer intensive course. He retired as a professor of Indian languages at the Osaka University, Japan. Post his retirement, he has been a professor Emeritus at the same university since 2007, teaching Foreign Studies. His language proficiency includes English, Hindi, Punjabi, bengali, Urdu, Gujarati, Asamiya, Marathi, Kashmere, Sindhi, Tamil, German, and French. He translated Japji Sahib, a Sikh prayer into Japanese, and he is the first Japanese-Punjabi researcher.

Awards 
In 2018, he was conferred the Padma Sri by the President of India, Ram Nath Kovind, at the Civil Investiture Ceremony on 2 April 2018 for his contribution to the fields of literature and education.

References 

1948 births
Living people
Recipients of the Padma Shri in literature & education